Saurenchelys meteori is an eel in the family Nettastomatidae (duckbill/witch eels). It was described by Wolfgang Klausewitz and Uwe Zajonz in 2000. It is a marine, deep water-dwelling eel which is known from the western Indian Ocean, including Djibouti, Eritrea, Egypt, Saudi Arabia, Sudan, Yemen and Somalia.

The species epithet "meteori" refers to the German research vessel Meteor. The IUCN redlist currently lists S. meteori as Least Concern, due to its deep water habitat and the presumed lack of major threats thereof.

References

Nettastomatidae
Taxa named by Wolfgang Klausewitz
Fish described in 2000